Dimitar Galinchev (born 15 September 1938) is a Bulgarian wrestler. He competed in the men's Greco-Roman 63 kg at the 1968 Summer Olympics.

References

1938 births
Living people
Bulgarian male sport wrestlers
Olympic wrestlers of Bulgaria
Wrestlers at the 1968 Summer Olympics
Place of birth missing (living people)